Bernard Mangoli Wanyama (born 24 December 1989) is a Kenyan international footballer who plays for A.F.C. Leopards as a midfielder.

Career
Born in Nairobi, Wanyama has played club football for A.F.C. Leopards, Sofapaka and Bandari.

He made his international debut for Kenya in 2012.

References

1989 births
Living people
Kenyan footballers
Kenya international footballers
A.F.C. Leopards players
Sofapaka F.C. players
Bandari F.C. (Kenya) players
Kenyan Premier League players
Association football midfielders